DNA is a 1997 American science fiction action horror film starring Mark Dacascos and Jürgen Prochnow, and directed by William Mesa. Filming took place in the Philippines. The film was retitled ADN - La menace for its French DVD release, and Scarabée for its television showing. It is also known as Genetic Code in some areas of Europe.

Plot
Ash Mattley (Mark Dacascos), a doctor in a small village deep in the jungles of Borneo, is approached by another scientist, Carl Wessinger (Jürgen Prochnow) regarding his studies of an enzyme found in a rare beetle. With the aid of Mattley and a group of natives, 

Wessinger secures several of the beetles, but then betrays his team and leaves them behind in a cave. Later, Wessinger uncovers a fossil in the jungle, but the natives in his new team fall in fear and worship before the deceased creature, which they call "Balakai."

Two years later, Mattley's clinic is beset by a series of gruesome murders in the jungle. The natives attribute the killings to Balakai, who is an ancient myth in the area. Mattley is enlisted by Claire Sommers (Robin McKee), a CIA agent, to find Wessinger. 

The government had been monitoring Wessinger's activities in the jungle after he began working for them, but the doctor had recently fallen off radar, and Sommers reveals she has been sent to track him down. Together with Matzu (Tom Taus), a boy whose sister was one of the victims, they set out into the jungle. Mattley does not initially believe that Balakai is real, but Sommers eventually tells him that the CIA was funding Wessinger's research into the fossil, leading him to change his mind.

Mattley and Sommers eventually reach Wessinger's compound, only to find it abandoned. When they examine the computers in the main lab, they find that Wessinger used the enzyme from the beetles to reanimate Balakai's fossil; it was an alien creature that terrorized the jungle centuries earlier. He intended to make clones of it for sale to the highest bidder, but it grew hostile and escaped. 

While fleeing from Balakai, who returned to the compound, Mattley and Sommers are separated from Matzu but find Wessinger and his assistants in a panic room. The two groups team up to keep the compound's power on and save Matzu, resulting in the death of Hatton (John H. Brennan). Balakai attacks in the main lab, but the flashing of Sommers's camera and the light from a helicopter frighten it away. 

A band of mercenaries led by Sergeant Reinhardt (Mark McCracken) that work for Wessinger arrive in the helicopter, ostensibly to aid in recapturing the creature, but instead help Wessinger subdue and imprison Mattley and Sommers. They also decide to use Wessinger's assistant, Azenfeld (Roger Aaron Brown) as bait for the creature, but Mattley and Sommers escape and free him. In the ensuing battle, Azenfeld sacrifices himself to set off a bomb that kills most of the mercenaries and Wessinger.

Mattley, Sommers and Matzu escape into the jungle, pursued by both the remaining mercenaries in a second helicopter and Balakai, which is able to track them using invisibility and heat vision. After destroying the helicopter, they are attacked by the creature, and Matzu is killed when he warns Mattley and Sommers of its presence. Matzu's tribe arrives to give him a burial and prepare Mattley for battle against Balakai. 

After a series of traps fails to do much damage, Mattley acquires a rocket launcher from Sommers and kills the creature by firing an explosive into its mouth. He and Sommers grow close at the bottom of a waterfall as the natives cheer and CIA rescue helicopters arrive.

Cast
 Mark Dacascos as Dr. Ash Mattley
 Jürgen Prochnow as Dr. Carl Wessinger
 Robin McKee as Claire Sommers
 Tom Taus as Matzu
 Roger Aaron Brown as Loren Azenfeld
 Mark McCracken as Sergeant Reinhardt / Balacau
 John H. Brennan as Hatton
 Joel Torre as Taka
 Cris Aguilar as Kasala
 Aniceto "Chito" Fulminar as Fulminari Chief
 Susan Africa as Nurse

Release

Home media
The film was released on DVD by Front Row Entertainment on June 25, 2001. In 2005, Platinum Disc released the film three separate times  that year, both as single and multi-feature editions.

Reception
Chris Parry from eFilmCritic.com gave the film one out of five stars. In his review, Parry panned the film for its poor writing, and virtual plagiarism of entire scenes from other films; while also writing, "If there's one benefit to watching ... DNA, it's in the realization that special effects technicians, no matter how skilled in that field, should never take part in any other task on a film shoot." 
TV Guide awarded the film two out of four stars, writing, "While its script comes off as an experiment in plot-splicing, this is an admittedly snappy, occasionally exciting monster movie."

References

External links
 Review - DevilDead 
 
 
 

American science fiction action films
1997 films
Direct-to-video science fiction films
American science fiction horror films
1990s science fiction action films
1990s science fiction horror films
Films set in jungles
1990s monster movies
Films shot in the Philippines
1990s English-language films
1990s American films